Miroslav Guzdek (born 3 August 1975 in Třinec, Czechoslovakia) is a male javelin thrower from the Czech Republic. His personal best throw is 85.74 metres, achieved in April 2002 in Germiston.

He finished seventh at the 2003 World Championships in Paris with a throw of 81.40 metres. He also competed in the 2004 Olympics, but failed to qualify from his pool.

Achievements

Seasonal bests by year
1999 - 77.36
2000 - 79.13
2001 - 82.40
2002 - 85.74
2003 - 83.71
2004 - 79.06
2006 - 75.06
2007 - 78.32
2008 - 76.68
2009 - 77.91
2010 - 76.83

External links

sports-reference

1975 births
Living people
Czech male javelin throwers
Athletes (track and field) at the 2004 Summer Olympics
Olympic athletes of the Czech Republic
Sportspeople from Třinec